Whitetop Mountain is a forested hill in the West-Central Interior of British Columbia, Canada. It is on the northwest side of junction of the Chilcotin River and Downton Creek. Whitetop is a volcanic cone of the Chilcotin Plateau and Anahim Volcanic Belt.

See also
List of volcanoes in Canada

References

One-thousanders of British Columbia
Volcanoes of British Columbia
Anahim Volcanic Belt
Pleistocene volcanoes
Hotspot volcanoes
Landforms of the Chilcotin
Range 3 Coast Land District
Volcanic cones